Megachile vandeveldii is a species of bee in the family Megachilidae. It was described by Meunier in 1888.

References

Vandeveldii
Insects described in 1888